The 2001 Women's United Soccer Association season served as the inaugural season for WUSA, the top level professional women's soccer league in the United States. The regular season began on April 14 and ended on August 12, with the postseason games being held on August 18 and August 25.

Attendance figures were high for the first season, particularly early in the season, though not near the levels organizers were expecting based on the attendance for the 1999 FIFA Women's World Cup.  The league spent its initial $40m budget, intended to last five years, in just this first season.

Competition format

The season began on April 14 and ended on August 12.
Each team played a total of 21 games, three against each opponent (either twice at home and once away or vice versa).  This caused an uneven schedule with teams hosting either 10 or 11 home games each.
The four teams with the most points from the regular season qualified for the playoffs. The regular season champions and runners-up hosted the fourth- and third-placed teams, respectively, in the single-game semifinals on August 18.  The winners of the semifinals met at Foxboro Stadium for the final on August 25.

Results table

Standings

Playoffs
Home teams listed second

Semi-finals

Founders Cup

Awards

Source:

Statistical leaders

Top scorers

Top assists

Source:

|}

See also

 List of WUSA drafts

References

External links
 WUSA Website (archive.org)
 WUSA on Fun While It Lasted

 
2002
2001–02 domestic women's association football leagues
2000–01 domestic women's association football leagues
1
2001 in American soccer leagues